The FC Istiklol 2017 season was Istiklol's ninth Tajik League season. They went into the season as defending Champions in the Tajik League, Tajik Cup and Tajik Supercup having completed a Domestic Treble during the 2016 season. They finished the season Tajik League Champions, and runners up in the Tajik Cup, Tajik Supercup and the AFC Cup.

Squad

Out on loan

Transfers

Winter

In:

Out:

Trialists:

Summer

In:

Out:

Trialists:

Friendlies

TFF Cup

Preliminary round

Finals Group

Knockout phase

Competitions

Tajik Supercup

Tajik League

Results summary

Results by round

Results

League table

Tajik Cup

Final

AFC Cup

Group stage

Knockout stage

Final

Squad statistics

Appearances and goals

|-
|colspan="14"|Players away from Istiklol on loan:
|-
|colspan="14"|Players who left Istiklol during the season:

|}

Goal scorers

Disciplinary record

See also
List of unbeaten football club seasons

References

External links 
 FC Istiklol Official Web Site

FC Istiklol seasons
Istiklol